Hultén is a surname. Notable people with the surname include:

Eric Hultén (1894–1981), Swedish botanist
Jens Hultén (born 1963), Swedish actor
Pontus Hultén (1924–2006), Swedish art collector and museum director
Vivi-Anne Hultén (1911–2003), Swedish figure skater

See also
Van Hulten